Josef Černý (born October 18, 1939 in Rožmitál pod Třemšínem, Bohemia and Moravia) is a retired ice hockey player who played in the Czechoslovak Extraliga. He won a three medals at four Winter Olympics. He was inducted into the International Ice Hockey Federation Hall of Fame in 2007.

External links

1939 births
People from Rožmitál pod Třemšínem
ATSE Graz players
Czech ice hockey left wingers
Czechoslovak ice hockey left wingers
HC Kometa Brno players
Ice hockey players at the 1960 Winter Olympics
Ice hockey players at the 1964 Winter Olympics
Ice hockey players at the 1968 Winter Olympics
Ice hockey players at the 1972 Winter Olympics
IIHF Hall of Fame inductees
Living people
Medalists at the 1964 Winter Olympics
Olympic bronze medalists for Czechoslovakia
Olympic ice hockey players of Czechoslovakia
Olympic medalists in ice hockey
Olympic silver medalists for Czechoslovakia
Medalists at the 1968 Winter Olympics
Medalists at the 1972 Winter Olympics
Sportspeople from the Central Bohemian Region
Czechoslovak ice hockey coaches
Czech ice hockey coaches
Czechoslovak expatriate sportspeople in Austria
Czechoslovak expatriate ice hockey people